The Buffalo Athletic Club version of the NWA World Tag Team Championship was a regional professional wrestling championship for tag teams that existed from 1956 until 1970. The championship was promoted by National Wrestling Alliance (NWA) member the Buffalo Athletic Club under promoters Ed Don George and Bobby Bruins, whose territory covered most of Ohio and portions of upstate New York. Many NWA territories used a version of the NWA World Tag Team Championship as the NWA bylaws allowed each territory to use the name. In 1957 no less than 13 different NWA World Tag Team Championships were promoted across the United States. In 1970 the Buffalo Athletic Club left the NWA to form an independent wrestling promotion known as the National Wrestling Federation, at which point they replaced the NWA World Tag Team Championship with the NWF World Tag Team Championship. Like all professional wrestling championships, this version of the NWA World Tag Team Championship was not won or lost competitively but instead determined by the decision of the bookers of a wrestling promotion. The title was awarded after the chosen team "won" a match to maintain the illusion that professional wrestling is a competitive sport.

The first recognized championship team was Ben and Mike Sharpe, but records are unclear on how they became the first champions in the Ohio/New York territory. The Sharpe Brothers previously held numerous other versions of the NWA World Tag Team Championship and were a highly regarded tag team, which makes it possible that they were simply declared champions by the promoters to legitimize their version of the championship. The last championship team consisted of Johnny Powers and Great Igor, who won the championship in November 1969. The Gallagher brothers, Doc and Mike, held the championship four times, a record both for combined and individual reigns. Due to gaps in the championship history and the lack of specific dates for some of the championship reigns it is impossible to determine which team held the championship for the longest time, although the Gallagher brothers held it for at least 481 days and are thus the most likely team to have the longest combined reigns.

Title history
Key

Team reigns by combined length
Key

Individual reigns by combined length
Key

Footnotes

Concurrent championships
Sources for 13 simultaneous NWA World Tag Team Championships
 NWA World Tag Team Championship (Los Angeles version)
 NWA World Tag Team Championship (San Francisco version)
 NWA World Tag Team Championship (Central States version)
 NWA World Tag Team Championship (Chicago version)
 NWA World Tag Team Championship (Buffalo Athletic Club version)
 NWA World Tag Team Championship (Georgia version)
 NWA World Tag Team Championship (Iowa/Nebraska version)
 NWA World Tag Team Championship (Indianapolis version)
 NWA World Tag Team Championship (Salt Lake Wrestling Club version)
 NWA World Tag Team Championship (Amarillo version)
 NWA World Tag Team Championship (Minneapolis version)
 NWA World Tag Team Championship (Texas version)
 NWA World Tag Team Championship (Mid-America version)

References

National Wrestling Alliance championships
Tag team wrestling championships
Professional wrestling in Texas
World professional wrestling championships